The Shr-Hwa International Tower is a 47-storey,  tall skyscraper located in West District, Taichung, Taiwan. When it was completed in 2004, it was the tallest building in Taichung and it held the title for 14 years until it was surpassed by The Landmark (Taichung). As of August 2022, it is the 21st tallest building in Taiwan and the second tallest in central Taiwan. This building has a peculiar shape of a bamboo. The 24th to 45th floors of the building houses a five-star hotel - The Landis Taichung.

Transportation
The building is accessible North West from Taichung station of Taiwan Railways.

See also
 List of tallest buildings in Taiwan

References

External links

 Shr-Hwa International Tower at Skyscrapers.cn

2004 establishments in Taiwan
Buildings and structures completed in 2004
Buildings and structures in Taichung
Skyscraper office buildings in Taichung
Skyscraper hotels in Taichung
Kohn Pedersen Fox buildings